The Champ Clark Bridge is a steel girder bridge over the Mississippi River connecting Louisiana, Missouri with Pike County, Illinois.

It carries U.S. Route 54 northeast to Pittsfield, Illinois, where U.S. 54 terminates. It opened on August 3, 2019, replacing an older bridge of the same name.

History 
The bridge is named after James Beauchamp Clark, a former Speaker of the House from Bowling Green, Missouri. Clark served as Speaker from 1911 to 1919.

The original bridge had opened in 1928 and had, over the years, grown functionally obsolete and structurally deficient.  Its replacement was the current bridge, completed in 2019.

Design and construction 
The new bridge was designed by HNTB and constructed by Massman Construction Co., both of Kansas City, MO.  It was completed under a design-build contract, where both companies performed their work under a single contract with the owner.

References

See also 

List of crossings of the Upper Mississippi River

Truss bridges in the United States
Road bridges in Illinois
Bridges of the United States Numbered Highway System
Bridges over the Mississippi River
Bridges completed in 1928
Buildings and structures in Pike County, Missouri
Bridges in Pike County, Illinois
Road bridges in Missouri
U.S. Route 54
2019 establishments in Missouri
Steel bridges in the United States
Interstate vehicle bridges in the United States
2019 establishments in Illinois